Carl von Ahlefeldt (25 April 1670 – 7 September 1722) was a German-Danish statesman. He was a stadtholder and by birth a member of the House of Ahlefeld. He was part of the inner circle around Frederick IV until 1712 and then became Governor-general of Slesvig-Holsten.

Early life and travels
Ahlefeldt was born at Hardenburg as the youngest son of Grand Chancellor Count Friedrich von Ahlefeldt-Rixingen and his second wife, Countess Marie Elisabeth of Leiningen-Dagsburg-Hartenburg (1648-1724). His father provided him with a thorough education. In 1684–86, he went on a long journey as part of his education. He was escorted by Nikolai Henrik Masius as Hofmeister. After his return, he benefitted from a close relationship with the royal family at the royal court in Copenhagen. In 1692, he escorted Crown Prince Frederick on a journey to Germany, France and Italy. In 1695, he was appointed chamberlain (kammerherre). In 1696, he replaced Johan Georg Holstein as the   Hofmeister of Prince Carl on a four-year journey to Germany, Switzerland, France, Italy and the Netherlands.

Career at the royal court
After their return in 1699, he received a number of prominent appointments at the royal court. In 1699, he became overkammerherre and overhofmester for the knight's academy in Copenhagen (1699-1703). In 1700, he became overstaldmester. Together with Christian Gyldenløve, he belonged to the inner circle around the young king Frederick VIV, which overshadowed both Grand Chancellor Conrad Reventlow and gehejmeråd Chr. S. Plessen.

In 1704, Ahlefeldt was appointed to president of kommercekollegiet and from 1708 for politi- og kommercekollegiet. In 1710, he became a member of konseillet, replacing Christian Lente   who had been opposed to Denmark's involvement in the Great Nordic Ear. As a member of konseillet, together with Otte Krabbe and Christian Sehested Ahelfeldt was responsible for the government in Copenhagen during the plague outbreak in 1711, while the king sought refuge at Koldinghus. After a few months, Ahlefeldt, Krabbe and Sehested, with permission the king, sought refuge at Jægersborg north of Copenhagen.

Governor-general of Norway
In 1712, Ahlefeldt was removed from konseillet as a result of his conflicts with the Reventlow family which had strengthened their influence at the court due to the king's involvement with  Anna Sophie Reventlow. Ahlefeldt was instead appointed to Governor-general of Slesvig-Holsten, an office he kept until his death.

Holdings

In 1702, Carl von Ahlefeldt acquired an estate at Kongens Lyngby north of Copenhagen, where he commissioned the architect François Dieussart  to build the first Sorgenfri. The building, a half-timbered, three-winged complex in Baroque style, was completed in 1705. The building was demolished and replaced by the current Sorgenfri Palace in the 1750s, reusing only the cellar and foundation of the old building. In 1703, he acquired an estate at Kalundborg from Frans Marselis and founded Østrup Manor (now Lerchenborg).

Ahlefeldt had inherited the county of  Rixingen the barony of Mörsberg in Lothringen, but had parted with the latter in 1709. Neither of his two older brothers had children. He therefore also inherited the country of Langeland and the estates Søgård, Gråsten, Ballegård, Grøngrøft and Årup im Slesvig  and Die Wildniss at Glückstadt.

Family
He married Countess Ulrike Antoinette of Danneskiold-Laurvig (1686-1755) on 2 March 1702 in Hamburg. She was the daughter of Count Ulrik Frederik Gyldenløve and his wife, Countess Antoinette Augusta of Aldenburg (1660–1701). They had the sons:
 Count Conrad Wilhelm of Ahlefeldt (1707-1791); married Wilhelmine Hedwig Antoinette von Gram (1711-1790) and had issue
 Count Frederik of Ahlefeldt (1702–73); married Bertha von Holstein (1705-1735) and had issue

Decorations
 Knight of the Dannebrog, 1698
 Knight of the Elephant, 1703.

References

Counts of Denmark
1670 births
1722 deaths
House of Ahlefeldt